David Burgess is an American former politician who served on the Georgia Public Service Commission from 1999 to 2007. He was the first Black member of the commission since its establishment in 1879.

Burgess graduated from Georgia Tech in 1981 with a Bachelor of Science Degree in Electrical Engineering, and worked as a public utilities engineer at the Public Service Commission. Rising through the ranks over the years, Burgess served as Director of Rates and Tariffs from 1988 until 1997, and from 1997 to 1999 as the Director of the commission's Telecommunications Unit. He was selected by Governor Roy Barnes in April 1999 to serve out the remaining term of Dave Baker, and subsequently won election to a full term in November 2000. He ascended to the role of chairman of the PSC in 2002. The last (and currently most recent, as of 2022) Democratic incumbent on the commission, he was defeated in his bid for a second full term in 2006 by Republican candidate Chuck Eaton.

References 

Georgia (U.S. state) politicians
Georgia (U.S. state) Democrats
1959 births
Living people
Georgia Public Service Commission